Rok cirkus is the fourth studio album by the Serbian rock band Smak, released in 1980.

Track listing

Personnel 
 Boris Aranđelović – vocals
 Radomir Mihajlović "Točak" – guitar
 Laza Ristovski – keyboards
 Zoran Milanović – bass
 Slobodan Stojanović "Kepa" – drums

External links 

Smak albums
1980 albums
Serbian-language albums